Hiri Rural LLG is a local-level government (LLG) of Central Province, Papua New Guinea.

Wards
01. Porebada
02. Boera
03. Papa
04. Roku
05. Lealea
06. Kido
07. Manumanu
08. Barakau
09. Tubusereia
10. Mt. Diamond
11. Gaire
12. Dagoda
13. Akuku
14. Laloki
15. Vanapa
16. Kerea
17. Brown River
18. Boteka

References

Local-level governments of Central Province (Papua New Guinea)